The 2008 Korea Open Super Series is the second tournament of the 2008 BWF Super Series in badminton. It was held in Seoul, South Korea from January 22 to January 27, 2008.

The men's singles final marred by the incident between Lin Dan and Korea coach Li Mao.

Men's singles

Seeds
 Lin Dan
 Lee Chong Wei
 Bao Chunlai
 Chen Hong
 Peter Gade
 Sony Dwi Kuncoro 
 Taufik Hidayat
 Kenneth Jonassen

Results

Women's singles

Seeds
 Xie Xingfang
 Zhang Ning
 Lu Lan
 Pi Hongyan
 Wang Chen
 Xu Huaiwen
 Wong Mew Choo
 Yip Pui Yin

Results

Men's doubles

Seeds
 Markis Kido / Hendra Setiawan
 Cai Yun / Fu Haifeng
 Jung Jae-sung / Lee Yong-dae
 Jens Eriksen / Martin Lundgaard Hansen
 Lee Jae-jin / Hwang Ji-man
 Luluk Hadiyanto / Alvent Yulianto
 Guo Zhendong / Xie Zhongbo
 Tadashi Ohtsuka / Keita Masuda

Results

Women's doubles

Seeds
 Zhang Yawen / Wei Yili
 Yang Wei / Zhang Jiewen
 Lee Kyung-won / Lee Hyo-jung
 Du Jing / Yu Yang
 Chien Yu-chin / Cheng Wen-hsing
 Kumiko Ogura / Reiko Shiota
 Gail Emms / Donna Kellogg
 Lilyana Natsir / Vita Marissa

Results

Mixed doubles

Seeds
 Zheng Bo / Gao Ling
 Nova Widianto / Lilyana Natsir
 Xie Zhongbo / Zhang Yawen
 Flandy Limpele / Vita Marissa
 Nathan Robertson / Gail Emms
 He Hanbin / Yu Yang
 Thomas Laybourn / Kamilla Rytter Juhl
 Sudket Prapakamol / Saralee Thungthongkam

Results

References

External links
Tournamentsoftware.com: 2008  Korea Open Super Series

Korea Open (badminton)
Sport in Seoul
2008 in South Korean sport
Korea Open